Jubilant may refer to:

 Dennis Jubilant, a double decker bus chassis
 Jubilant FoodWorks, an Indian company
 Jubilant Power, 1976 album by Ted Curson
 Jubilant Sykes, African-American baritone